Arthur Alexander Lewis III (born June 5, 1972, in Hollywood, California) is a Paralympian athlete from the United States competing mainly in category T12 and T13 100m, 200m, long jump, triple jump, 4 × 100 m relay and 4 × 400 m relay.

References

External links
 

1972 births
Living people
Paralympic track and field athletes of the United States
Paralympic bronze medalists for the United States
People from Hollywood, Los Angeles
Athletes (track and field) at the 1996 Summer Paralympics
Medalists at the 1996 Summer Paralympics
Paralympic medalists in athletics (track and field)
American male sprinters
American male long jumpers
American male triple jumpers
Athletes (track and field) at the 2000 Summer Paralympics
Athletes (track and field) at the 1992 Summer Paralympics